Kibbie Lake lies in the remote north-west portion of Yosemite National Park in the United States.  It is accessible only to hikers and equestrians. It is the largest non-artificial lake in the national park.

References

Lakes of Yosemite National Park
Lakes of Tuolumne County, California